This is a list of events that happened in Northern Ireland in 1944.

Incumbents
 Governor - 	 The Duke of Abercorn 
 Prime Minister - Basil Brooke

Events
13 March – The British Government prohibits all travel between Great Britain and Ireland.
20 May – Aircraft carrier  is launched at the Harland and Wolff shipyard in Belfast to British Admiralty order.
22 August – Men from Tyrone and Fermanagh form an Anti-Partition League in Dublin.
16 November – Aircraft carrier  is launched at the Harland and Wolff shipyard in Belfast to British Admiralty order.

Arts and literature
Robert Greacen's poetry Northern Harvest and One Recent Evening is published.
Forrest Reid's novel Young Tom is published.
John Luke paints The Road to the West.

Sport

Football
Irish League
Winners: Belfast Celtic

Irish Cup
Winners: Belfast Celtic 3 - 1 Linfield

Births
5 January – Edward Haughey, Baron Ballyedmond, businessman (killed in helicopter accident in England 2014).
27 January – Mairead Corrigan, peace activist, recipient of the Nobel Peace Prize.
20 March – Alan Harper, Church of Ireland Archbishop of Armagh and Primate of All Ireland (2007 - ).
28 March – Nell McCafferty, journalist, writer and playwright.
28 May – Patricia Quinn, actress.
3 June – Thomas Burns, Bishop of the Forces.
8 June – David Craig, footballer.
28 June – Ian Adamson - Ulster Unionist Lord Mayor of Belfast (died 2019).
24 July – Jim Armstrong, guitarist.
15 October – David Trimble, leader of the Ulster Unionist Party, recipient of the Nobel Peace Prize (died 2022).
28 October – Gerry Anderson, radio and television broadcaster (died 2014).
Colin McClelland, journalist.
Ruth Patterson, first woman to be ordained to the ministry of the Presbyterian Church in Ireland.

Deaths
June - Joseph Campbell, poet and lyricist (born 1879).
August - Noble Huston, Presbyterian minister and dog breeder.
28 November – Sir William Moore, 1st Baronet, Unionist MP and Lord Chief Justice of Northern Ireland 1925-1937 (born 1864).

See also
1944 in Scotland
1944 in Wales